In mathematics, the scalar projection of a vector  on (or onto) a vector , also known as the scalar resolute of  in the direction of , is given by:

The term scalar component refers sometimes to scalar projection, as, in Cartesian coordinates, the components of a vector are the scalar projections in the directions of the coordinate axes.

Definition based on angle θ

   ( in the figure)

Definition in terms of a and b
 

By this property, the definition of the scalar projection  becomes:

Properties
The scalar projection has a negative sign if . It coincides with the length of the corresponding vector projection if the angle is smaller than 90°. More exactly, if the vector projection is denoted  and its length :

  if ,
  if .

See also
 Scalar product
 Cross product
 Vector projection

Sources
Dot products - www.mit.org
Scalar projection - Flexbooks.ck12.org
Scalar Projection & Vector Projection - medium.com
Lesson Explainer: Scalar Projection | Nagwa
Operations on vectors